Kosta Zafiriou is a Swiss musician and music manager, one of the owners of Bottom Row Promotion company, which currently manages the bands Unisonic, Helloween, Axxis, Gotthard and Krokus. A former hard rock drummer, Zafiriou is known as one of the founding members of bands Pink Cream 69, Place Vendome and Unisonic.

Biography

Zafiriou started to play drums at the age of 16. His first band was Redline, where he played with the guitarist Alfred Koffler, in 1982. Later in 1986 he joined the band Kymera where he played with vocalist Andi Deris. Kymera recorded two EPs with Zafiriou and Deris before they left to form the band Pink Cream 69 with guitarist Alfred Koffler and bassist Dennis Ward in 1987.

Zafiriou played with Pink Cream 69 from their debut album to their tenth In10sity before leaving the band in 2012.

Zafiriou and Pink Cream 69 bandmate Dennis Ward have also worked with two projects together with ex-Helloween vocalist Michael Kiske: Place Vendome, a melodic rock studio project created by the record company Frontiers Records, and Unisonic, a hard rock band managed by Zafiriou that released their first album and did the first world tour in 2012, also marking the first full collaboration by ex-Helloween members Michael Kiske and Kai Hansen in a band since Kai's departure from Helloween.

Zafiriou also recorded albums and played a few shows with bands Axxis, Krokus and with vocalist D. C. Cooper, as a drummer.

On 6 September 2016 Zafiriou announced his retirement as a professional drummer, remaining his job as music manager.

Discography

with Pink Cream 69
 1989: Pink Cream 69
 1991: One Size Fits All
 1993: Games People Play
 1995: Change
 1997: Food for Thought
 1998: Electrified
 2000: Sonic Dynamite
 2000: Mixery (EP)
 2001: Endangered
 2003: Live
 2004: Thunderdome
 2007: In10sity
 2009: Live in Karlsruhe

with D.C. Cooper
 1999: D.C. Cooper

with Axxis
 2004: Time Machine	 
 2011: 20 Years of Axxis

with Place Vendome
 2005: Place Vendome
 2009: Streets of Fire

with Unisonic
2012: Ignition (EP)
2012: Unisonic
2014: For the Kingdom (EP)
2014: Light of Dawn
2017: Live in Wacken

with Krokus
2013: Dirty Dynamite

References

External links 
 Unisonic official website
 Russian website of Pink Cream 69
 

1966 births
Living people
People from Zofingen
Swiss drummers
Swiss male musicians
Male drummers
Rock drummers
Swiss people of Greek descent
Unisonic (band) members
Pink Cream 69 members